Jiří Kovář (1925/1926 – 10 June 2008) was a Czech swimmer. He competed in the men's 100 metre backstroke at the 1948 Summer Olympics.

References

External links
 

1920s births
2008 deaths
Czech male swimmers
Olympic swimmers of Czechoslovakia
Swimmers at the 1948 Summer Olympics
Place of birth missing
Male backstroke swimmers